Action Democratic Party (ADP) is a political party in Nigeria.
It was founded in June 2017 by some politically concerned Nigerians who feel there should be a third force to counter the APC and PDP. The current National Chairman of the party is Eng. Yabagi Sani. The party got officially registered and announced by the Independent National Electoral Commission (INEC) as a full-fledged political party in June 2017.

References

2017 establishments in Nigeria
Political parties established in 2017
Political parties in Nigeria